Araamagu Dhonkamana is a 2003 Maldivian horror film written and directed by Imad Ismail. Produced by Aslam Rasheed under Slam Studio, the film stars Asad Shareef, Mariyam Shazna, Mohamed Afrah and Mariyam Nazima in pivotal roles. Shooting of the film took place in K. Kaashidhoo.

Premise
The film narrates the story of a woman spirit who rises from the sea and marries a toddy extractor, Dhon Ahammad (Assadh Shareef). The man, believing she is a human being, marries her and lives a happy life until a wise man exposes her real truth to Dhon Ahammad.

Cast 
 Mariyam Shazna as Dhon Kamana
 Asad Shareef as Dhon Ahammad
 Mariyam Nazima as Faathuma
 Mohamed Afrah as Moosa
 Chilhiya Moosa Manik as Mudhimbe
Yazeedh Ismail as Sidhuqee
Shifa as Jameela
Saleem as Thahkhaan

Soundtrack

Accolades

References

2003 films
2003 horror films
Maldivian horror films